Haldyn Glass Limited (HGL) is a listed company at Bombay Stock Exchange in India (BSE: 515147) (ISIN Code 506D01012) manufacturing clear glass containers. Promoted by Haldyn Corporation Limited having its manufacturing plant in Vadodara, Gujarat while its administrative office is located in Goregaon East, Mumbai. Haldyn Glass  Limited (HGL) was incorporated in the year 1991.  N.D. Shetty is the Chairman and Mr. Tarun N. Shetty is Managing Director of the company.

The manufacturing plant of HGL is located at Village Gavasad, Taluka Padra, District Vadodara, in the state  of Gujarat.  Currently has total melting capacity of 360 tons per day with 8 I.S. machines which gives us leverage over the competition in manufacturing a very wide range of containers from 90 ml to 1000 ml. The I.S. machines are capable of producing 2 million high quality containers every day.Value-addition is also facilitated through the decoration facilities, consisting of modern multi-colour printing machines.

The Company specializes in Soda Lime Flint glass containers catering to wide range of national & international customers, across the liquor, food & beverage and cosmetic industries.

In 2015, Haldyn Glass Ltd entered into Joint Venture (JV) with Heinz Glas International GMBH, Germany, for the manufacturing of perfume and cosmetic glass bottles for the export and local market. The joint venture company established is Haldyn Heinz Fine Glass Pvt. Ltd

References

External links
 Official website of Haldyn Glass
 BSE Announcements, Year 2008 

Glassmaking companies of India
Companies based in Vadodara
Indian companies established in 1991
Manufacturing companies established in 1991
Indian brands
1991 establishments in Gujarat
Companies listed on the Bombay Stock Exchange